Frölundaborg is an indoor arena located in the Frölunda borough of Gothenburg, Sweden. Frölundaborg is primarily used as an indoor venue for ice hockey games. It has a capacity of 7,600 people.

The attendance record is 10,244, set in 1970. It also has been used when the main arena, Scandinavium, has been scheduled for other activities. This has been the case several times for unplanned matches, such as when Frölunda HC played in the Swedish Championship finals. It also serves as a venue for handball events.

The Frölundaborg, along with the Scandinavium, will be a venue hosting the 2024 IIHF World Junior Championship in Gothenburg. It will host games in Pool B.

History
Frölundaborg cost 6.3 million SEK (Swedish Krona) to build in 1967. Since then, 4.9 million SEK has been invested in the facility, which was valued to 3.7 million SEK in the beginning of 2006. The arena changed owners in February 2006 and underwent renovations for 100 million SEK in 2007 to make it a modern arena.

See also
Assyriska BK
Utsiktens BK
Frölunda HC
Västra Frölunda IF
Näsets SK
Älvsborgs FF
IF Väster
 List of indoor arenas in Sweden
 List of indoor arenas in Nordic countries

References

External links

Sports venues in Gothenburg
Frölunda HC
Indoor arenas in Sweden
Indoor ice hockey venues in Sweden
Ice hockey venues in Sweden
Figure skating venues in Sweden
Handball venues in Sweden
Sports venues completed in 1967
1967 establishments in Sweden